Promethes is a genus of parasitoid wasps belonging to the family Ichneumonidae.

The species of this genus are found in Europe and Northern America.

Species:
 Promethes albipes Szepligeti, 1898
 Promethes albiventralis Diller, 1984

References

Ichneumonidae
Ichneumonidae genera